Ezio Mauro (born 24 October 1948) is an Italian journalist. He was editor-in-chief of the newspaper la Repubblica from 1996 to 2016.

Biography 
Mauro was born in Dronero, Italy. He started his career as journalist writing for the local newspaper Gazzetta del Popolo in Turin. In 1981 he moved to La Stampa, as correspondent from the United States, and in 1988 he moved to la Repubblica as correspondent from Moscow, Russia.

In 1990 he re-joined the newspaper La Stampa as co-editor, and in 1992 as editor.

In 1996 Mauro replaced Eugenio Scalfari as editor of La Repubblica.

External links 
 Articles written on The Observer

1948 births
Living people
People from Dronero
Italian newspaper editors
Italian male journalists
La Repubblica editors
La Stampa editors